Barter rings (Tagalog: panika) are ring-shaped gold ingots used as currency in the Philippines until the 16th century. These barter rings are bigger than a doughnut in size and are made of nearly pure gold.

Description
The early Filipinos traded piloncitos along with barter rings.

Barter rings varies in thickness with a dual purpose: round hollow circlets of gold used as earrings or anklets by kadatuan and high-ranking nobility, aside for money. They are also very similar to the first coins invented in the Kingdom of Lydia in present-day Turkey. Barter rings were circulated in the Philippines up to the 16th century. As the discovery of gold deposits were seen by the locals, the precious metal was mined and worked in the Philippines, evidenced by many Spanish accounts like one in 1586 that stated:

See also
 Piloncitos and Siamese photduang
 History of Philippine money
 Philippine peso, the currency of the modern Philippines.
 Philippine real
 List of historical currencies

References

External links
 https://asiasociety.org/new-york/exhibitions/philippine-gold-treasures-forgotten-kingdoms
Central Bank of the Philippines – Money museum
 

Ancient currencies
Medieval currencies
Modern obsolete currencies
Philippines currency history
1600 disestablishments